This article is a list of released Tulu films in the Tulu language.
 Enna Tangadi (My Sister)
 Daredha Budedhi (Official wife)
 Pagetta Puge (Fume of Hate)
 Bisatti Babu (Knife Babu)
 Koti Chennayya
 Kaasdaya Kandane (Money is honey)
 Udalda Tudar (Flame Of Heart)
 Yaan Sanyasi Aape (I will be a Saint)
 Bayya Mallige (Evening Jasmine)
 Yer Malthina Tappu (Who the wrong)
 Saaviradorti Saavithri (Saavithri - The one in Thousand)
 Inquilab Zindabad
 Tulu Naada Siri (Wealth of Tulunad)
 Sangama Saakshi (Witness of Union)
 Nyaayogaad Enna Baduku (life for Justice)
 Bollidota (Silver Garden)
 Kariyani Kattandi Kandani (unofficial husband)
 Bhagyavantedi (Fortune Lady)
 Badkere Budle (Let me live)
 Daareda Seere (The wedding saree)
 Raathri Pagel (The Night and Day)
 Pettayi Pili (Wounded Tiger)
 Badkonji Kabite (Life is poet)
 Satya Olundu (Where is Truth)
 Bangar Patler (Gold-hearted Patel)
 Badk Da Bile (The life value)
 September 8
 Maari Bale (Mari bale-The fishing net)
 Onthe Edjast Malpi (Just adjust)
 Suddha (Pure)
 Kadala Mage (The Son of Sea)
 Koti Chennaya 
 Badi (Dowry)
 Gaggara (The Anklets)
 Birse (The Smart)
 Kanchilda Baale (Blessed Girl)
 Oriyardori Asal (Smarter than other)
 Aamait Asal-Eemait Kusal (Edge of gentle-edge of mischief)
 Bangarda Kural (Golden Corn)
 Sompa
 Telikeda Bolli (Smiling Star)
 Jokulatike
 Rickshaw Driver (Auto driver) won Karnataka State Film Award for Best Regional film
 Pakkilu Mooji (Three birds)
 Barke-Kudlada Pilikulena Kathe (Barke – The saga of Manglore rowdyism)
 Nirel (The Shadow)
 Rang (The Colour)
 Brahmashri Narayana Guru Swamy (Story of famous saint narayana guru)
 Chaali Polilu (Rascals)
 Madime (The Wedding)
 Soombe (Sorry)
 Ekka Saka 
 Oriyan Thoonda Oriyagapuji (One against Other)
 Dhand(Army)
 Super Marmaye (Super Son-in-Law)
 Chandi Kori (Calm Rooster)
 Right Bokka Left Nadutu Kudonji (Right and Left - One more in between)
 Ice Cream
 Eregla Panodchi 
 Pilibail Yamunakka 
 Yesa 
 Guddeda bhoota
 Dombrata
 Chapter
 Udal
 Shutterdulai
 Namma kusalda javaner
 Rang rang da dibbanna
 Maskiri
 Arjun weds Amrutha
 Yekkur
 Nemada boolya
 Thottil
 Bale Pudar Deeka E Preethig
 Yera ullerge
 Rama Krishna Govinda
 Son of Joker
 Gant kalver
 Ambulance
 Karne
 Pundi Panavu
 Jugari
 Kambalabettu bhatrena magal
 Nambugeda Koragajja
 Last bench
 Non veg
 Jay maruthi Yuvaka 
 Balipe
 Aaye Yer?
 Manjarun
 Madipu
 Tambila
 420 Jokulu
 Kuntibail Kuntamma
 Savarna Dheerga Sandhi
 Karnikada Kallurti 
 Kammena
 Yenna
 Agoli Manjanna
 Rahukala GuligaKala
 Majhi Mukhyamantri
 Deyi Baidethi
 Gabbar Singh
 Pepperere pererere
 Illokel
 Pingara
 Rocket
 DagalBajilu
 Ra-Ra
 Tulunada Sampige
 Ammer Polisa 
 Umil
 English yenkleg barpuji
 Girgit
 Pattanaje
 Pammane the great 
 My name is Annappa 
 Pathis gang 
 Dabak Daba Aisa 
 Kori rotti
 Kudla Cafe 
 Ambar Caterers 
 Jai Tulunad
 Thottil 
 Appe teacher 
 Atidaonji dina 
 Jabaardasth shankara 
 Are Marler 
 Pirkilu 
 Belchappa
 Golmaal
 Katpadi kattapa
 Pettkammi
 Paddayi
 Kudhakana Mage
 2 ekre
Gamjaal
Vikrant
Yeregavuye Kirikiri
Soda Sharbhat
Bojaraj MBBS
Magane Mahisha
Raj Sounds And Lights

See also 
 Tulu cinema
 Lists of Tulu-language films
 Tulu Movie Actors
 Tulu Movie Actresses
 Karnataka State Film Award for Best Regional Film
 RED FM Tulu Film Awards
 Tulu Cinemotsava 2015

References

External links 
 Tulu Movies List at IMDB

Tulu
Tulu cinema